Kaja Martin is an American actor, comedian, writer, director, and film producer.

Early life and education
Martin was born and raised in Palo Alto, California. She graduated from Henry M. Gunn High School. From there, she went on to Occidental College where she studied film and theater.

Career

YouTube
Kaja Martin was a series regular on Equals Three Productions Booze Lightyear, Date Debate, Comedians On. She took over as host of The Equals Three Show in 2015.

Vice-President of production company Equals Three Studios, which has a combined online audience of over 17 million followers, Kaja has helmed several successful YouTube shows including: The Equals Three Show, Top 6, Booze Lightyear, Comedians On, and Date Debate. As of 2017, the YouTube channel had earned more than three billion views and 10.4 million subscribers, making it one of the most viewed channels on YouTube at the time.

Martin transitioned to producing narrative shorts and web series with projects Riley Rewind and Miss Earth. Riley rewind first premiered on Facebook in 2013 and quickly after was sold to NETFLIX. Miss Earth was partially financed by Brian Grazer and Ron Howard's production company New Form Digital. After its premier Miss Earth was adapted into a web series retitled Miss 2059 and released on Verizon's go90 app in June 2016.

Film
Martin is the co-creator (with digital influencer Ray William Johnson) of the film production company, Mom & Pop Empire. Currently they are working on a documentary project seeking to expose internet service provider monopolies. Martin and Johnson are co-producers along with Marc Hustvedt and Max Benator's Supergravity Pictures. Mom & Pop Empire had previously co-produced the film Manson Family Vacation with Jay and Mark Duplass. The film premiered at South by Southwest in 2015 and its distribution rights were purchased by Netflix soon after.
Martin also worked as an actor and producer with digital influencer, Anna Akana, on several short films.

Recognition and awards
Variety – Variety magazine calls web series, Riley Rewind, the 7th best web series of 2013
Webby Winner: Voice Award: Riley Rewind – 2014
Fringe Winner: Theatre Unleashed Award: Reconstruction – 2012

References

External links
 
 Official site

American actors
Living people
American film producers
American writers
Year of birth missing (living people)
Gunn High School alumni